The Honorable Congress of the State of Puebla is the legislative branch of  the government of the State of Puebla. It was constituted for the first time after the independence of Mexico on January 1, 1826. The Congress is the governmental deliberative body of  Puebla, which is equal to, and independent of, the executive. The Congress is unicameral.

See also
List of Mexican state congresses

External links
Official website

Government of Puebla
Puebla
Puebla